Shaun Saiko (born November 13, 1989) is a Canadian retired professional soccer player.

Career

Club
After impressing during a trial, Saiko began his professional career with Middlesbrough in the English Football League Championship. Despite playing extensively with the reserves he never made a first team appearance for the club and was released at the end of the 2009-10 season.

Returning home to Canada, he was signed by FC Edmonton of the new North American Soccer League in 2011. He scored the first goal in franchise history on April 9, 2011, in a 2-1 victory over the Fort Lauderdale Strikers. The club re-signed Saiko for the 2012 season on October 12, 2011.

In May 2012, he was named the NASL player of the month for his five goals and two assists, including a hat trick against the Carolina Railhawks.

On November 5, 2013 it was announced that Saiko had been released from FC Edmonton.

On November 26, 2013 San Antonio Scorpions announced that Saiko has signed with the club for the 2014 season. Saiko made six appearances for a total of 183 minutes played, and scored one goal. He was released from his contract on August 6, 2014.

International
Saiko has played for Canadian national youth teams at U15, U20 and U23 levels, and was part of the Canadian team which took part in the 2009 CONCACAF U-20 Championship and attempted to qualify for the FIFA U-20 World Cup.

References

External links
 FC Edmonton bio
 

1989 births
Living people
Canadian soccer players
Middlesbrough F.C. players
FC Edmonton players
Soccer people from Alberta
Sportspeople from St. Albert, Alberta
San Antonio Scorpions players
North American Soccer League players
Expatriate footballers in England
Expatriate soccer players in the United States
Canada men's youth international soccer players
Canada men's under-23 international soccer players
Association football midfielders
Canadian expatriate soccer players
Canadian expatriate sportspeople in England